Shahid Ahmed (born 15 August 1988) is a Pakistani footballer, who plays for KRL FC. He is also a member of Pakistan national football team.

Events played: Test Series vs Sri Lanka 2002, World Cup QR 2003, Islamic Games 2005, Indo Pak Series 2005, 14th Asian Cup Qualifiers 2006, 19th World Cup qualifiers 2007, Pakistan-Nepal Series 2008.

References

1988 births
Living people
Pakistani footballers
Pakistan international footballers
Footballers at the 2006 Asian Games
South Asian Games gold medalists for Pakistan
South Asian Games medalists in football
Association football forwards
Asian Games competitors for Pakistan